Ribonuclease P/MRP protein subunit POP5 is an enzyme that in humans is encoded by the POP5 gene.

References

Further reading